The bronze-tailed starling or bronze-tailed glossy-starling (Lamprotornis chalcurus) is a species of starling in the family Sturnidae. It is found in Benin, Burkina Faso, Cameroon, the Central African Republic, Chad, the Democratic Republic of the Congo, Gambia, Ghana, Guinea, Guinea-Bissau, Ivory Coast, Kenya, Mali, Niger, Nigeria, Senegal, South Sudan, Sudan, Togo, and Uganda.

References

bronze-tailed starling
Birds of Sub-Saharan Africa
bronze-tailed starling
bronze-tailed starling
Taxonomy articles created by Polbot